The 2007 Cup of China was the third event of six in the 2007–08 ISU Grand Prix of Figure Skating, a senior-level international invitational competition series. It was held at the International Sports Center in Harbin on November 7–11. Medals were awarded in the disciplines of men's singles, ladies' singles, pair skating, and ice dancing. Skaters earned points toward qualifying for the 2007–08 Grand Prix Final.

Results

Men

Ladies

Pairs
Jessica Miller / Ian Moram attempted a throw quadruple salchow jump in their free skating. They were credited with the rotation, but it was not landed successfully.

Ice dancing

References

External links
 Official site
 
  

Cup Of China, 2007
Cup of China
Cup of China
Sport in Harbin